Cedrik-Marcel Stebe was the champion in 2011, but did not qualify for the event in 2012, since he played mostly ATP World Tour tournaments in that season.
Guido Pella defeated Adrian Ungur 6–3, 6–7(4–7), 7–6(7–4) in the final to win the title.

Seeds

  Thomaz Bellucci (round robin, withdrew because of a shoulder injury)
  Paolo Lorenzi (round robin)
  Victor Hănescu (semifinals)
  Rubén Ramírez Hidalgo (round robin)
  Aljaž Bedene (semifinals)
  Adrian Ungur (final)
  Guido Pella (champion)
  Gastão Elias (round robin)

Alternates

  Thiago Alves (replaced Thomaz Bellucci, round robin)
  Rogério Dutra da Silva (did not play)

Draw

Finals

Green group
Standings are determined by: 1. number of wins; 2. number of matches; 3. in two-players-ties, head-to-head records; 4. in three-players-ties, percentage of sets won, or of games won; 5. steering-committee decision.

Yellow group
Standings are determined by: 1. number of wins; 2. number of matches; 3. in two-players-ties, head-to-head records; 4. in three-players-ties, percentage of sets won, or of games won; 5. steering-committee decision.

References
Main Draw

Finals
2012 Singles
2012 in Brazilian tennis